Cradley may refer to:

 Cradley, Herefordshire, England
 Cradley and Storridge, a civil parish formerly called just "Cradley"
 Cradley, West Midlands, a suburb of Halesowen in the West Midlands
 Cradley Heath, a small town in the Sandwell borough, in the West Midlands
 Cradley Heathens, a motorcycle speedway team from Dudley, England